The 2020 trial in France for the former French President Nicolas Sarkozy dealt with allegations that he bribed a judge with a retirement package in return for information on an investigation into alleged campaign finance violations due to payments he is said to have received from heiress Liliane Bettencourt. The trial opened on 24 November 2020. Prosecutors have asked for a four-year jail sentence (of which two would be suspended) for Sarkozy, the implicated judge (Gilbert Azibert) as well as Sarkozy's lawyer, Thierry Herzog. On 4 December 2020, Ziad Takieddine, a Lebanese businessman who allegedly helped finance Sarkozy's 2007 campaign with help from former Libyan leader Muammar Gaddafi, was detained in Lebanon, but was allowed a condition prison a few days later after agreeing to abide by a travel ban. The defendants deny the accusations. The trial concluded on 10 December; the verdict was rendered on 1 March 2021. Sarkozy, Azibert and Herzog were found guilty and sentenced to three years in jail for corruption. Two years of this sentence are suspended, and one to be served in prison. Sarkozy has appealed, which suspends the ruling.

On 20 May 2021, a new criminal trial related to illegal campaign funding began for Sarkozy, as well as 13 other defendants who were said to have been involved in the Bygmalion scandal. Sarkozy's second corruption trial involved allegations of diverting tens of millions of euros which was intended to be spent on his failed 2012 re-election campaign and then hiring a PR firm to cover it up. Rather than spend this illicit money on his re-election campaign, Sarkozy instead overspent it on lavish campaign rallies and events. On 30 September 2021, Sarkozy, as well as his co-defendants, would be convicted at the conclusion of this corruption trial as well. For this conviction, he was given a 1 year prison sentence, though he was also given the option to instead serve this sentence at home with an electronic bracelet.

References

November 2020 events in France
December 2020 events in France
March 2021 events in France
Corruption trial
Corruption in France
Trials in France
2020s trials
France–Libya relations